Cuiping Subdistrict is a subdistrict in Dachuan District, Dazhou, Sichuan, China. , it administers the following seven residential communities: 
Caojiezi Community
Jinhua Community
Nanba Community
Xinnan Community
Xinqiao Community
Shijiawan Community
Gayun Community

See also 
 List of township-level divisions of Sichuan

References 

Township-level divisions of Sichuan
Dazhou
Subdistricts of the People's Republic of China